Pyrgota undata, the waved light fly, is a species of fly in the family Pyrgotidae.

References

External links

 

Pyrgotidae
Articles created by Qbugbot
Insects described in 1830